This is a complete filmography of Xuxa, a Brazilian singer, actress, and television presenter.

Xuxa's first starring role was in Amor Estranho Amor (English title: Love Strange Love), a controversial 1982, erotic film directed by Walter Hugo Khouri. The plot involves an adult man's recollection of a short period in his life in 1937. As a teenager, he visited his mother, the favorite woman of an important politician, in a bordello owned by her, right before key political changes in Brazil. In those hours, he discovers his own sexuality. Although rather tame by today's modern standards, the movie was considered somewhat controversial by some because it contains two brief scenes of sensuality between a libertine character played by Xuxa and the teenager.

She broke out on her own in 1988 in Super Xuxa contra Baixo Astral, only to rejoin the Os Trapalhões in 1989 in A Princesa Xuxa e os Trapalhões, one of the quartet's most popular movies. The formula was repeated the following year in O Mistério de Robin Hood (1990), on which Xuxa's production company Xuxa Produções acted as associate producer.

In 1990 Xuxa teamed up with another hugely popular children's TV performer, Sérgio Mallandro, in a joint venture entitled Lua de Cristal. With just under 5 million spectators, it was the biggest film of the 1990s, and it guaranteed Xuxa a second box-officie hit at a time when the Brazilian film industry had all but ground to a halt.

She returned to cinemas in 1999 with Xuxa Requebra. Xuxa also picked up a popular fascination with duendes and their magical powers in Xuxa e os Duendes, and the sequel, Xuxa e os Duendes 2 - No Caminho das Fadas. She released another couple of films in quick succession in 2003 and 2004, Xuxa Abracadabra and Xuxa e o Tesouro da Cidade Perdida.

In 2009, Xuxa launched her film Xuxa em O Mistério de Feiurinha, which tells the story of what happens in fairy tales after the "and they all lived happily ever after" ending. The film is an adaptation of Pedro Bandeira's book O Fantástico Mistério de Feiurinha that has sold over 2 million copies. The movie's cast included such names as: Sasha, Luciano Szafir and Luciano Huck, Angélica and Hebe Camargo. It had over 1.3 million viewers and was also shown in the US and Angola, where its numbers surpassed James Cameron's Avatar.

Filmography

Films

Television programs

Brazil

International

Telenovelas and TV series

Television special

References

External links 
 

Actress filmographies
Filmography